Nana Awuah Darko Ampem (1932–2005) was a Ghanaian financier and chief.
He was founder and first chairman of Vanguard Assurance and also the Nkosuohene(progress chief) of Asante Juaben.

Early life
Awuah Darko was born in 1932. Awuah Darko attended Accra Academy for secondary education, completing in 1951.

Finance career
Nana Awuah Darko Ampem started his career as an insurance broker. In 1969 he established Marine and General Insurance Brokers after studies and working abroad. Marine and General Insurance Brokers was the first insurance brokering firm in Ghana.  
 
In 1972, he was the first president of the Chartered Institute of Insurance Ghana. A law passed in 1972 made it obligatory for all state institutions in Ghana to deal directly with State Insurance Company and not through a broker, bringing Awuah Darko's brokering business to a halt. Compelled by this law, Awuah-Darko started Vanguard Assurance in 1975. Vanguard Assurance is the first indigenous privately owned insurance company in Ghana.  
 
Nana Awuah Darko Ampem was a father-figure to many Ghanaian entrepreneurs who were to later come into the insurance industry. A notable example was Kwesi Essel-Koomson of KEK Insurance Brokers, for whom Awuah-Darko suggested and encouraged an insurance career.  
 
Awuah-Darko was the founder and Chairman of the Ghana Leasing Company Limited. In 1990 Awuah Darko was amongst the three founding directors of CAL Merchant Bank. He led the founding of City Investments Company Limited in 1995, a finance house which was later to be the parent company of Premium Bank after his death. Awuah-Darko was a Council member of the Ghana Stock Exchange and a member of the Asanteman Finance Advisory Committee.

Chieftaincy
In 1985, the Asantehene first made room for the enstoolment of an Nkosuohene (which means progress chief) in Asante. Following his overlord, the Asantehene's lead, the Juabenhene, Nana Otuo Siriboe selected Nana Awuah Darko Ampem  to become the Nkosuohene of Asante Juaben.
As a progress chief, he appropriately served as Chairman of the Juaben Rural Bank. Nana Awuah-Darko Ampem was the Chairman of the Juaben Rural Bank from its inception in October 1984 until his death in December 2005.

Sports
Nana Awuah Darko Ampem was the first Ghanaian Captain of the Accra Polo Club. In later life, he became a member of the board of trustees of the Accra Polo Club. Nana was also a former Chairman and a life patron of the Ghana Squash Association.

Personal life
Nana Awuah Darko Ampem was married to Judith Ellen Awuah-Darko.

Awuah Darko died on Sunday 25 November 2005 at the 31 Military Hospital in Accra and was buried on 23 February 2006.

References

20th-century Ghanaian businesspeople
1932 births
2005 deaths